A calligram is text arranged in such a way that it forms a thematically related image. It can be a poem, a phrase, a portion of scripture, or a single word; the visual arrangement can rely on certain use of the typeface, calligraphy or handwriting, for instance along non-parallel and curved text lines, or in shaped paragraphs. The image created by the words illustrates the text by expressing visually what it says, or something closely associated; it can also, on purpose, show something contradictory with the text or otherwise be misleading, or can contribute additional thoughts and meanings to the text.

Writers
Guillaume Apollinaire was a famous calligram writer and author of a book of poems called Calligrammes.

José Juan Tablada wrote a book of Spanish-language calligrams entitled Li-Po y otros poemas.

Gallery

See also
Ambigram
Concrete poetry
Islamic calligraphy
Micrography
Visual poetry

References

 (with many Japanese calligrams)

Graphic poetry

ru:Фигурные стихи